William Deary (born 27 June 1997) is an English sabre fencer.

He began fencing at the age of 10, at Truro Preparatory School. In 2015, he moved to London which enabled him to join British Fencing's World Class Programme.

He won the British sabre national title at the British Fencing Championships in 2019, 2021 and 2022.

References

British male sabre fencers
Living people
1997 births